Goat Island is a small uninhabited Island located .2 miles from India Hook, South Carolina in Lake Wylie of York County, South Carolina, United States.

Sources
Saving Goat Island

Lake islands of South Carolina
Uninhabited islands of the United States
Landforms of York County, South Carolina